Gods of Metal was the biggest Italian metal festival, held annually from 1997 to 2016. It took place in early summer, usually on the first or second weekend of June. It was most often held at venues in or near Milan, but took place in Bologna three times and one time in Turin. It was acquired by Live Nation in 2010.

Lineups

1997
Held on June 7 at Palavobis in Milan.

1998
Held on June 6 at Forum Open Air Arena in Milan.

1999
Held on June 5 and June 6 at Forum Open Air Arena in Assago-Milan.

2000
Held on June 10 and June 11 at Stadio Brianteo in Monza.

2001
Held on June 9 at Palavobis in Milan.

2002
Held on June 8 and June 9 at Stadio Brianteo in Monza.

2003
Held on June 8 at Palavobis in Milan.

2004
Held on June 5 and June 6 at Arena Parco Nord in Bologna.

Due to heavy rain, the UFO concert was cancelled and Stratovarius played the next day, between the Quireboys and W.A.S.P.

2005
Held on June 11 and June 12 at Arena Parco Nord in Bologna.

2006
Held on June 1-June 4 at Idroscalo in Milan.

2007
Held on June 2, June 3 and June 30 at Idroscalo in Milan.

2008
Held on June 27, June 28 and June 29 at Arena Parco Nord in Bologna

2009

Held on June 27 and June 28 at Stadio Brianteo in Monza

2010 

Held on June 25, June 26 and June 27 at Parco della Certosa Reale in Collegno

Stage 1

Stage 2

2011 

Held on 22 June at Arena Fiera, Rho

2012 
Held on 21, 22, 23 and 24 June at Arena Fiera, Rho

2016 
Held on 2  June at Autodromo Nazionale Monza in Monza

References

External links
Official website

Heavy metal festivals in Italy
Live Nation Entertainment
Festivals in Milan